Madhavrao Patil  was an Indian politician. He was elected to the Lok Sabha, the lower house of the Parliament of India, as a member of the Indian National Congress.He joined the  Nationalist Congress Party in 1999.

References

External links
Official biographical sketch in Parliament of India website

Lok Sabha members from Maharashtra
1940 births
2020 deaths
India MPs 1998–1999